FCB may refer to:

Banks 
 Fairfield County Bank, in the United States
 Farm Credit Bank, part of the Farm Credit System in the United States
 Florida Community Bank, in the United States
 First Community Bank, in Kenya
 First Consolidated Bank, in the Philippines

Football clubs 
 FC Baník Ostrava, Czech Republic
 FC Barcelona, Spain
 FC Barcelona Femení, women's section of the above
 FC Basel, Switzerland
 FC Bayern Munich, Germany
 FC Bayern Munich, women's section of the above
 FC Bendigo, Australia 
 1. FC Bocholt, Germany
 Club Brugge KV, Belgium
 FK Budućnost Podgorica, Montenegro
 FC Büsingen, Germany

Other uses 
 FCB (advertising agency), an American advertising agency (Foote, Cone & Belding).
 Fired clay brick
 FCB group in the classification of bacteria
 File Control Block
 Fluocortin butyl, a synthetic glucocorticoid
 Forms Control Buffer in a printer 
 Fort Collins Brewery, an American brewery
 Frozen carbonated beverage
 Farsi Contemporary Bible
 Functional Cargo Block, a component of the Soviet TKS spacecraft